Gregory Tyrone Spires (born August 12, 1974) is a former American football defensive end in the National Football League (NFL). He was drafted by the New England Patriots in the third round of the 1998 NFL Draft. He played college football at Florida State.

Spires was also a member for the Cleveland Browns, Tampa Bay Buccaneers, and Oakland Raiders. He earned a Super Bowl ring with the Buccaneers in Super Bowl XXXVII.

College career
Greg Spires played college football at Florida State University as a Seminole. He was a four-year letterman from 1994-1998. His NFL Draft status dropped to the third round as a result of a cracked fibula entering the end of his junior year. It carried through to three games of his senior season. Also, Spires did not start in his junior season. Throughout his college career, he played the positions of linebacker, nose guard, and defensive end. Greg Spires was redshirted in 1993.

Professional career

New England Patriots
After being drafted by the New England Patriots (3rd round, 83rd selection overall), Spires played in 15 games including the playoff appearance that the Patriots had. He recorded two sacks against the Jacksonville Jaguars in the postseason. During the 1999 season, he played 11 games until he suffered a hip injury against the Buffalo Bills on November 28, 1999 and eventually was placed on injured reserve for the remainder of the 1999 season. In 2000, Greg Spires had a great year. He played in all 16 games, and started two of them. Spires recorded a career high 6 sacks and tied Willie McGinest for the team lead. Spires also forced three fumbles. He was re-signed by the Patriots on April 30, 2001. Because of team issues, Greg Spires was released by the Patriots towards the start of the 2001 season, on September 3, 2001. He was claimed and signed by the Cleveland Browns the very next day.

Cleveland Browns
Greg Spires' career with the Cleveland Browns was short-lived. Despite being there for just one season, Spires played in all 16 games and started 4. He recorded four sacks that season.

Tampa Bay Buccaneers
Greg Spires became an unrestricted free agent after the 2001 season and was signed by the Tampa Bay Buccaneers. Spires found a place with the Bucs and was their perennial starter at left defensive end from 2002 to 2007. He came at just the right time, as the Bucs sailed through the playoffs and won Super Bowl XXXVII against the Oakland Raiders. He totaled 47 tackles, 3.5 sacks, one forced fumble, one fumble recovery, and one pass defended lining up opposite right defensive end Simeon Rice. Because of the chemistry of this defense, the Tampa Bay Buccaneers became the best pass defense and best overall defense in the NFL. He played on one of the top-tier defenses in 2003, 2004, and 2005 (where they finished first again). Spires helped the Buccaneers to the playoffs, but they lost in the Wild Card round  to the Washington Redskins. On February 27, 2008, the Buccaneers released him.

Oakland Raiders
On May 10, 2008, he signed with the Oakland Raiders. He was later released on August 25, 2008.

External links
Official Website
New England Patriots bio
Oakland Raiders bio
Tampa Bay Buccaneers bio

1974 births
Living people
People from Marianna, Florida
American football defensive ends
Florida State Seminoles football players
New England Patriots players
Cleveland Browns players
Tampa Bay Buccaneers players
Oakland Raiders players